Il voto is a 1950 Italian melodrama film directed by Mario Bonnard. It is based upon the Salvatore Di Giacomo play.

Plot
During the absence of her husband, who left for a fishing cruise in the seas of China, Carmela falls under the spell of Vito, a young fisherman.

Cast 
Doris Duranti: Carmela
Giorgio De Lullo: Vito
Maria Grazia Francia: Cristina
Roberto Murolo: Gennaro
Enrico Glori: Lo sfruttatore
Bella Starace Sainati: Donna Rosa
Leopoldo Valenti: Pasquale
Liana Billi: Nunziata
Lia Thomas: Assunta
Armando Guarnieri:	Il brigadiere
Sophia Loren:  A commoner at the Piedigrotta festival (credited as Sofia Scicolone)
Tina Pica

References

External links

1950 films
Films directed by Mario Bonnard
Italian drama films
1950 drama films
Italian black-and-white films
1950s Italian films